The War Cry is the official news publication of The Salvation Army. Today national versions of it are sold in countries all over the world to raise funds in support of the Army's social work.

History

The first edition of The War Cry was printed on 27 December 1879 in London, England.
In 1880, US Salvation Army Commissioner George Scott Railton published the Salvation News, a small newsletter. He published the first US edition of The War Cry in January 1881 in St. Louis, Missouri. Between 1920 and 1970, each U.S. territory published its own individual version of The War Cry. In 1970, the Salvation Army's US National Headquarters started publishing a nationwide version of The War Cry.

Notes and references

External links
The War Cry page of The Salvation Army in Canada (now known as Salvationist)
The War Cry page of The Salvation Army in Australia
The War Cry page of The Salvation Army in the UK and Ireland
The War Cry page of The Salvation Army in the USA

1879 establishments in England
Religious magazines published in the United Kingdom
Christian magazines
Magazines published in England
Magazines published in London
Magazines established in 1879
The Salvation Army